Until 1874, Iceland was a dependency of Denmark rather than an independent nation. In 1874, Denmark granted Iceland home rule, which again was expanded in 1904. In 1918, The Act of Union, an agreement between Denmark, recognized Iceland as a fully sovereign state united with Denmark under a common king. Iceland established its own flag and asked that Denmark represent its foreign affairs and defense interests; thus, the United States Ambassador to Denmark conducted foreign relations between the United States and Iceland.

As a result, on April 10, the Parliament of Iceland elected to take control of their own foreign affairs. His title was Envoy Extraordinary and Minister Plenipotentiary. The US has maintained continuous diplomatic relations with Iceland since then.

The current ambassador is Carrin Patman, who presented her credentials to President Guðni Th. Jóhannesson on October 6, 2022.

List of ambassadors

See also
Ambassadors of the United States
Foreign relations of Iceland
Iceland–United States relations

References

Further reading
 }
 
 

1941 establishments
Main
Iceland
United States